Everitt is a surname. Notable people with the surname include:

Allen Edward Everitt (1824–1882) English architectural artist
Andrejs Everitt (born 1989) Australian rules footballer
Anthony Everitt (born 1940) British academic
Anthoni Everitt (born 1974) Professional Karate Instructor
Arnold Everitt Campbell (1906–1980)
Arthur Everitt (1872–1952) British fencer
Barney Everitt, of the E-M-F Company
Barry Everitt (rugby player) (born 1976), former rugby union footballer
Barry Everitt (scientist) (born 1946), British neuroscientist
Bill Everitt (baseball) (1868–1938), Major League Baseball player
Bill Everitt (racing driver) (1901–1993), MG race car driver
Dick Everitt, English footballer
Francis Everitt
Keith Everitt, politician
Leon Everitt (born 1947) former Major League Baseball pitcher
Matt Everitt (born 1972) English radio presenter and drummer
Michael Everitt (born 1968) Archdeacon of Lancaster, England
Mike Everitt (baseball) (born 1964), American baseball umpire
Mike Everitt (footballer), association football player and coach
Peter Everitt, Australian footballer
Rawinia Everitt (born 1986), New Zealand rugby player
Richard Everitt (1979-1994), victim of a racially motivated murder in London
Russell Everitt (1881–1973) English cricketer
Steve Everitt (born 1970) American former professional offensive lineman
William Littell Everitt (1900–1986)

See also
Everett (disambiguation)
Richard Everitt (disambiguation)